Pityogenes bidentatus is a species of bark beetle native to Europe.

References

Curculionidae
Beetles described in 1783
Beetles of Europe